Vincent Laigle (born 23 January 1973) is a retired French badminton player. Currently he is coaching in the French badminton team.

Achievements

IBF International 
Men's doubles

Mixed doubles

References

External links 

1973 births
Living people
French male badminton players